Shaam Dhalay is a Pakistani romance drama film directed and produced by Santosh Kumar. It was the only film that Kumar ever directed and produced. Kumar also played the lead role opposite Sabiha Khanum. The music of the film was composed by Rashid Attre. Although a commercially average film of the year 1960, it became popular due to Ghulam Mustafa Tabassum's ghazal Sau Baar Chaman Mehka, Sau Baar Bahar Aaee, performed by Naseem Begum for the film.

The film won 4 Nigar Awards, at annual award ceremony.

Cast 

 Santosh Kumar
 Sabiha Khanam
 Allauddin
 Rukhsana
 Nazar
 Azad
 Rakhshi
 Sahira

Music

Awards 

Shaam Dhalay received 4 Nigar Awards in the following categories:

References

External links 
 

1960 films
Pakistani romance films